Paul Robert Lilburne (born 11 February 1973) is a member of the Western Australian Legislative Assembly for the electoral district of Carine for the Australian Labor Party. He won his seat at the 2021 Western Australian state election.

References 

Living people
1973 births
Australian Labor Party members of the Parliament of Western Australia
Members of the Western Australian Legislative Assembly
21st-century Australian politicians